Johnny Chan Chen Airstrip  is an airport serving Chan Chen, a village in the Corozal District of Belize.

See also

Transport in Belize
List of airports in Belize

References

External links 
Aerodromes in Belize - pdf

Airports in Belize
Corozal District